Lake Carpa is a lake in Peru, located northeast of Arahuay in Huanza District, Huarochiri Province, Lima Region. It covers an area of 3 square kilometers (1 square mile) and has an average depth of 20 meters (64 feet).

See also
List of lakes in Peru

References

Lakes of Peru
Lakes of Lima Region